2. is the ordinal form of the number two in a number of European languages.

2. may also refer to:

Association football
 2. Bundesliga, a German association football league.
 2. Bundesliga Nord (1974–81), a defunct division of the 2. Fußball-Bundesliga.
 2. Bundesliga Süd (1974–81), a defunct division of the 2. Fußball-Bundesliga.
 2. Bundesliga (women), a German women's association football league.
 2. Liga Interregional, a Swiss association football league.
 2. Liga (Switzerland), a Swiss association football league.
 2. Liga (Slovakia), a Slovak association football league.

Ice hockey
 2. národní hokejová liga, a Czech ice hockey league.

Rugby union
 2. Rugby-Bundesliga
 2. Rugby Bundesliga (Austria)

See also
 2. Liga (disambiguation)
 1. (disambiguation)